Virnopillya is village in Izium Raion (district) in Kharkiv Oblast of eastern Ukraine, at about  southeast by south from the centre of Kharkiv city.

The village came under attack by Russian forces in May 2022, during the Russian invasion of Ukraine.

Demographics
The settlement had 752 inhabitants in 2001, native language distribution as of the Ukrainian Census of 2001:
 Ukrainian: 92.77%
 Russian: 5.94%
 other languages: 1.29%

References

Villages in Izium Raion